Darkuchi is a village in Baksa district of Assam, situated on the north bank of the Brahmaputra River.

Transportation
Darkuchi is near National Highway 31 and is well connected to nearby towns with different modes of transport.

See also
Dampur

References

Cities and towns in Kamrup district